Collingsworth may refer to:

Collingsworth County, Texas, a county in Texas, United States
USS Collingsworth (APA-146), a Haskell-class attack transport of the United States Navy

People with the surname
Arthur J. Collingsworth (1944–2013), American United Nations official